Roberto Minervini (born 1970) is an Italian film director, screenwriter, photographer, and Music Producer. His recent films, focusing on American rural life and marginalized populations, have been praised for their "disarming directness." Minervini's films are notable for their use of both documentary observation and dramatized elements, sometimes in combination.

His 2018 documentary What You Gonna Do When the World's on Fire? won a number of awards at the 2018 Venice Film Festival, and The Other Side (2015) was shown in the Un Certain Regard section of the 2015 Cannes Film Festival.

Early life 
Born in Fermo, Italy, in 1970, Minervini obtained a degree in Economics and Commerce at the University of Ancona and a doctorate in "History of Cinema" at the Autonomous University of Madrid. 

He moved to the United States in October 2000, to work as an IT consultant. In 2004, he completed a master's degree in Media studies at the New School University in New York City. From 2006 to 2007, he taught at De La Salle University in Manila, Philippines.

Career 
Minervini began writing, directing, and producing films shortly after completing his master's degree at the New School. Prior to producing full-length feature films, he made a number of shorts, including Voodoo Doll, Come to Daddy, Notes, and The Fireflies. 2011's The Passage was a nominee for the Golden Zenith at the Montréal World Film Festival. 

Low Tide, his 2012 film, showed at the Venice Film Festival, winning the Christopher D. Smithers Foundation Special Award and garnering a nomination for the Venice Horizons Award. His film Stop the Pounding Heart was included in the Official Selection of the 2013 Cannes Film Festival and has won numerous awards at other festivals, including the David di Donatello Award for Best Documentary. 

The Other Side was shown in the Un Certain Regard section of the 2015 Cannes Film Festival 2015. Minervini was part of the Jury of the "Horizons" section at the 71st Venice International Film Festival (2014).

Filmography 

 Voodoo Doll (Short Film, 2005)
 Come to Daddy (Short Film, 2005)
 Notes (Short Film, 2005)
 The Fireflies (Short Film, 2006)
 The Passage (2011)
 Low Tide (2012)
 Stop the Pounding Heart (2013)
 The Other Side (2015)
 What You Gonna Do When the World's on Fire? (2018)

Awards and recognition

References

Italian film directors
Italian photographers
Italian record producers
Italian screenwriters
Living people
1970 births
People from Fermo